Cruzen Island is a rocky, but mostly snow-covered island about  north-northeast of the mouth of Land Glacier off the coast of Marie Byrd Land, Antarctica. It was discovered in 1940 on aerial flights from the West Base of the US Antarctic Service, and named for Commander Richard Cruzen, US Navy, the commanding officer of the USS Bear and second in command of the expedition.

References
 

Islands of Marie Byrd Land